Jeffrey W. Delzer (born September 1, 1959) is an American politician in the state of North Dakota. He is a member of the North Dakota House of Representatives, representing the 8th district. A Republican, he was first elected in 1992. He is an alumnus of Dawson Community College and a farmer. He was Speaker of the North Dakota House of Representatives from 2007 to 2009.

References

1959 births
Living people
Republican Party members of the North Dakota House of Representatives
People from McLean County, North Dakota
Farmers from North Dakota
Dawson College alumni
Speakers of the North Dakota House of Representatives
21st-century American politicians